The following lists events that happened during 1932 in the Republic of Paraguay.

Incumbents
President: Emiliano González Navero until January 28 (acting), José Patricio Guggiari until August 25, Eusebio Ayala
Vice President: Emiliano González Navero

Events
September 7–29 - Battle of Boquerón

Births

 
1930s in Paraguay
Years of the 20th century in Paraguay
Paraguay
Paraguay